Killukudi is a village in the Kilvelur taluk of Nagapattinam district, Tamil Nadu, India.

References

Villages in Pudukkottai district